Joan Wallace-Benjamin is a non-profit executive in Boston, Massachusetts. She was the president and CEO of The Home for Little Wanderers from May 2003 until her retirement in January 2018.

Biography
Wallace-Benjamin is a trustee of Wellesley College and a member of the board of overseers for the Heller School for Social Policy and Management. Additionally she has been a corporation member of Northeastern University and a trustee of Pine Manor College. She graduated from Wellesley College with a BA in psychology and received her Ph.D. from the Heller School for Social Policy and Management at Brandeis University.

Prior to joining The Home in 2003, Wallace-Benjamin served as a consultant with Whitehead Mann, a global executive recruiting firm; president and chief executive officer of The Urban League of Eastern Massachusetts for 11 years; director of operations for Boys and Girls Clubs of Boston; deputy director of ABCD Head Start, and a research analyst for Abt Associates. She brought to all of her positions a remarkable array of skills that have empowered the organizations to fulfill their missions of service to children and families, prevention, expert clinical care, outcomes, research, and advocacy.

November 2006 brought an exciting new professional opportunity for Wallace-Benjamin when Governor-Elect Deval Patrick named her his chief of staff. In this role, she helped the governor to move the administration's policy, legislative and political agenda forward. Her previous experience in management and organizational effectiveness in both the non-profit and for-profit sectors prepared her to assume this important responsibility.

Awards
2002: Academy of Women Achiever's Award from Boston YWCA
2002: Humanitarian Award from the National Conference for Community and justice
2003: Boston's 100 Women of Power, Boston Magazine, May 2003 edition
2003: Lifetime Achievement Award from Rosie's Place, Boston
2003: Lady Baden-Powell Good Scout Award from Boston Minuteman Council, Boy Scouts of America
2004: Exceptional Women Award for Community Service from Magic 106.7,
2005: Pinnacle Award, Achievement in Management Non-Profit from the Boston Chamber of Commerce
2007: Civil Rights Award from Urban League, April 2007
2010: Henry L. Shattuck Public Service City Champion Award, October 2010
2011: Boston's 50 Most Powerful Women, Boston Magazine. February 2011 edition

Wallace-Benjamin holds honorary doctorates from the University of Massachusetts Amherst, Newbury College, Chestnut Hill, MA, Curry College, Milton, MA, Bridgewater State University, and New England School of Law, Boston, MA.

External links
http://www.thehome.org/site/PageServer?pagename=about_leadership_joan

American nonprofit chief executives
Heller School for Social Policy and Management alumni
Wellesley College alumni
American women chief executives
Chiefs of staff to United States state governors